is a traditional  Norwegian cured meat made from salted and dried leg of lamb.   is a very popular dish in Norway and is often served with other preserved food at a Christmas buffet or on Norwegian Constitution Day.

Curing time is normally about three months, but  may be matured for a year or more. In some parts of the region, especially in the Voss area, the leg is also slightly smoked (using a cold smoke process) before curing to prevent any mould-related problems that may occur when drying meat in a humid, mild climate.  It is still quite common for many Norwegians to salt and cure the meat at home. The finished meat is dark red to brown in color. Fresh-cut slices of high quality  are smooth, tender and somewhat shiny, but not moist. The taste is slightly sweet and not too salty. The meat must have a pronounced, but never rancid, taste of mutton.

Normally the meat is served as thin slices, but it is also common—at informal gatherings—to send the leg around the table with a sharp, stubby knife. The guests then slice the leg themselves. Thus, in western Norway  is called , literally 'whittle-meat', but this name may also originate from the word , 'to cure'.  is sometimes served with sour cream porridge (rømmegraut), scrambled eggs, a dill and double-cream-based, lukewarm potato salad and oven baked Bergen-style "water-pretzels" are other typical combinations.

See also
 Norwegian cuisine
 List of Norwegian dishes
 Pinnekjøtt
 Smalahove
 Ingrid Espelid Hovig

References

External links
Norwegian Food Blog - Make Norwegian Fenalår - Cured leg of a lamb from scratch

Lamb dishes
Norwegian cuisine
Lunch meat
Dried meat